Reggie Jantjies was a South African football player.

Career 
Jantjies played for an amateur club,  Idas Valley AFC, in his native Stellenbosch, before starring for Hellenic and Cape Town Spurs in the FPL in the 1980s and 1990s.

Death 
Jantjies died in hospital on 12 September 2018. He had been suffering from diabetes and had had his leg amputated.

References 

South African soccer players
Association football midfielders
Year of birth missing
People from Stellenbosch
Soccer players from the Western Cape